Calvin Thornton Durgin (January 7, 1893 – March 25, 1965) was a vice admiral who served in the U.S. Navy from 1916 until 1951.  He served as Deputy Chief of Naval Operations for Air in 1949.

Biography

Calvin T. Durgin was born in Palmyra, New Jersey on January 7, 1893.  He graduated from the U.S. Naval Academy at Annapolis and was commissioned an ensign on June 3, 1916.  As a young officer he served aboard destroyers and battleships in World War I.

In 1920, he became a naval aviator and did graduate work in aeronautical engineering at M.I.T. before receiving a master's degree there in 1924.  Durgin, became known as a naval expert in air combat and served in the Mediterranean, Atlantic and Pacific during World War II.

During the war, he commanded the aircraft carrier, Ranger during an assault on Morocco and commanded a carrier group during the 1944 invasion of southern France.

In the Pacific, he commanded a fleet of escort carrier groups.  These groups provided support for landings in the Philippines, Iwo Jima, and Okinawa.

In 1949, he became the Deputy Chief of Naval Operations for Air and in 1950 became the commander of the United States' First Pacific Fleet.  His last assignment, on active duty, was as president of the Board of Inspection and Survey.

In 1951, Durgin retired from active service and upon retirement, was promoted to the rank of vice admiral.  At this time, he took the position as president of SUNY Maritime College, where he served until 1959 when he retired to a farm at Dogue, Virginia.

Durgin died on March 25, 1965, of a heart attack while attending the Metropolitan Opera.

Durgin's papers are kept in the archives of the Washington Navy Yard, and the Stephen B. Luce Library of Maritime College.

Sources
"Calvin T. Durgin, Retired Admiral," New York Times, March 26, 1965.
 Papers of Vice Admiral Calvin T. Durgin, 1942–1951.

External links

1893 births
1965 deaths
United States Navy personnel of World War I
United States Navy World War II admirals
United States Naval Academy alumni
United States Navy vice admirals
Recipients of the Navy Distinguished Service Medal
Recipients of the Legion of Merit
People from Palmyra, New Jersey
Military personnel from New Jersey